Sudhi Ranjan Das (1 October 1894 – 18 September 1977) was the 5th Chief Justice of India, serving from 1 February 1956 to 30 September 1959. Das also served as chairman of The Statesman.

Background and education
S.R. Das was born in Calcutta into the prominent Baidya Das family(originally Dasgupta) of Telirbagh. He was born to Rakhal Chandra Das and Binodini Das.

He attended Patha Bhavana, Santiniketan, where he was one of the first four pupils of Rabindranath Tagore.
After finishing his intermediate examinations at the Scottish Church College, he moved on to the Bangabasi College which was affiliated to the University of Calcutta from which he graduated. He later studied law at University College London and was
awarded first-class honours LL.B. from University of London in 1918. 

He was called to the Bar in 1918 at Gray's Inn, London.

Judicial career
He was elevated to the Bench as an Additional Judge of Calcutta High Court in 1942. He became a Puisne Judge, Calcutta High Court in 1944.

He served as the Chief Justice of Punjab High Court from 1949 to 1950.

He was appointed to the Federal Court/Supreme Court of India in 1950 days before the commencement of the new Constitution. He officiated twice as Acting Chief Justice of India before holding the highest Judicial office of the country- Chief Justice of India for over three years. He retired on 30 September 1959.

Family life
Sudhi Ranjan Das was married to the former Swapna Majumdar, the daughter of S.B. Majumdar, an ICS officer. By his wife, he had two sons, Group Captain Suranjan Das and Suhrid Ranjan Das, and a daughter, Anjana. His daughter married his junior counsel Ashoke Sen, who later became Union Law Minister. His children were all named by Rabindranath Tagore.

Deshbandhu Chittaranjan Das, Sarala Roy, Abhla Bose and Satish Ranjan Das are his cousins.

1, Safdurjung Road

The bungalow at 1, Safdurjung Road used by then Prime Minister Indira Gandhi as her residence was priorly inhabited by Chief Justice S.R. Das. This bungalow witnessed the assassination of the PM Mrs. Indira Gandhi in 1984. It is now a museum.

References

1894 births
1977 deaths
Bengali Hindus
Brahmos
Das family of Telirbagh
Judges of the Calcutta High Court
20th-century Indian judges
Chief justices of India
Alumni of the University of London
Alumni of University College London
Scottish Church College alumni
Bangabasi College alumni
University of Calcutta alumni
Visva-Bharati University alumni
People associated with Santiniketan
20th-century Indian lawyers